"Broken Trust" is a song written by Jimbeau Hinson and was produced by Ron Chancey, and performed by Brenda Lee and The Oak Ridge Boys.  The song reached #9 on the U.S. country chart and #14 on the Canadian country chart in 1980.  It was featured on her 1980 album, Take Me Back.

References

1980 songs
1980 singles
Songs written by Jimbeau Hinson
Brenda Lee songs
The Oak Ridge Boys songs
Song recordings produced by Ron Chancey